Soner Şentürk (born August 7, 1986) is a Turkish professional basketball player who plays as a point guard for Ego Spor of the TB2L.

References

External links
 Soner Şentürk FIBA Profile
 Soner Şentürk TBLStat.net Profile
 Soner Şentürk Eurobasket Profile
 Soner Şentürk TBL Profile

1986 births
Living people
Darüşşafaka Basketbol players
Karşıyaka basketball players
Merkezefendi Belediyesi Denizli Basket players
Point guards
Basketball players from Istanbul
Turkish men's basketball players
Türk Telekom B.K. players